Vittal Ramamurthy (Kannada : ವಿಟ್ಟಲ್ ರಾಮಮೂರ್ತಿ) is a violinist in the Carnatic music tradition of South India. He is a 'Top Ranking' Artiste of All India Radio and has performed in national radio and television, in addition to live concerts.

Musical training
Born in a family of musicians and music connoisseurs, Vittal started his musical journey at home.  He started learning Carnatic music from his mother, Krishnaveni, who is the main guiding force in all walks of his life. His sister is Smt. Rajarajeshwary Bhat, a music teacher based in Houston, Texas, and his niece is Smt. Kruthi Bhat. He was introduced to violin by his grandfather, Late Sangeethabhushanam B.V. Subba Rao.  He continued training under Hosahalli Venkataram and T. Rukmini.

Soloist and accompanist
He has performed in 6000+ concerts worldwide.  He has accompanied his guru, Lalgudi Jayaraman in his vocal, violin duet 
and trio concerts. He has accompanied vocal stalwarts like D. K. Jayaraman, Dr. Mangalampalli Balamuralikrishna, R. K. Srikanthan, Nedunuri Krishnamurthy, Madurai T. N. Seshagopalan, O. S. Thyagarajan T. K. Govinda Rao, T. V. Sankaranarayanan, K. J. Yesudas, Bombay Sisters and Sudha Raghunathan.  He has also accompanied the current generation vocal artistes like Vijay Siva, Neyveli Santhanagopalan, Sanjay Subramanian, T. M. Krishna, P. Unni Krishnan, Bombay Jayashri, S. Sowmya and others.

He has also accompanied great instrumental stalwarts like N. Ramani (Flute), Kadri Gopalnath (Saxophone), N. Ravikiran (Chitravina), Shashank Subramanyam (Flute). He has participated in the World Music Festival in 'Théâtre de la Ville', Paris and other International Festivals in Singapore and Dubai.  In addition to his solo recordings, he has accompanied all the popular artistes in hundreds of commercial audio recordings.

Teacher and musicologist
Ramamurthy has students in India, USA, Canada, Australia, and France.  As a musicologist, he has given lecture demonstrations and workshops at such prestigious universities as Rice University (Houston), Concordia University (Montreal,) and Harvard University (Boston).

In his passion for music and selfless contribution to the growth of Carnatic music, Vittal Ramamurthy and his family organize summer camps in his native home, 'KARUNBITHIL', Nidle Dharmasthala in Karnataka every year.  About 250 children from surrounding villages attend this camp which is in the style of the Gurukulam system.  They stay in his house and learn music for a whole week and share it with all their friends. Boarding, lodging and all expenses are borne by Vittal Rammamurthy's family. Eminent artists are invited to give workshops and concerts to these young musicians.  Artistes like Dr. Mangalampalli Balamuralikrishna, Umayalpuram K. Sivaraman, M. Chandrasekaran, Vellore G. Ramabhadran, Kamalakara Rao,  Neyveli Santhanagopalan, Lalgudi Krishnan, Vijay Siva, T. M. Krishna, Bombay Jayashri, S. Sowmya, Abhishek Raghuram, R. K. Shriramkumar, Embar Kannan, Kalyani Sharma, S.P. Ramh, Sankari Krishnan, and others have graced the shibira and motivated the students by their teachings. Every year this is the most awaited musical event by all students and rasikas alike. Students flock to this village for the music camp from not only Karnataka and Chennai, but also as far as New Jersey, Texas and California.

Awards
 Kalaimani
 Yuva Kala Bharathi
 Swara Gyana Bharathi
 Best Violinist (from Music Academy and Sri Krishna Gana Sabha of Chennai, India)
 Asthana Vidwan of Kanchi Kamakoti Peetam
 Vadya Kala Vipanchee
 Best Teacher Award from the VD Swami Arts Academy
 Maharajapuram Santhanam Foundation Meritorious Award for Achievement
 Vigneshwara Gana Mani Award from Sri Vigneshwara Cultural Academy
 Asthana Vidwan of Sri Dakshinamnaya Sringeri Sharada Peetham
 Vani Kala Sudhakara from Sri Thyaga Brahma Gana Sabha

External links
Vittal Ramamurthy's Official Page 
Listener's pleasure on musicindiaonline.com 
Accompanying his Guru Sri. Lalgudi Jayaraman on the tambura (Courtesy of YouTube)
In Concert with Shashank – video clipping (Courtesy of YouTube)
In Concert with TM Krishna – video clipping (Courtesy of YouTube)
In Concert with TM Krishna – video clipping (Courtesy of YouTube)
In Concert with Sudha Ragunathan – video clipping (Courtesy of YouTube)
In Concert with P. Unnikrishnan – video clipping (Courtesy of YouTube)
In Concert with P.Unnikrishnan – video clipping (Courtesy of YouTube)
Documentary on Karunbithil Shibira conducted by Vittal Ramamurthy and family – Part 1 (Courtesy of YouTube)
Documentary on Karunbithil Shibira conducted by Vittal Ramamurthy and family – Part 2 (Courtesy of YouTube)
Documentary on Karunbithil Shibira conducted by Vittal Ramamurthy and family – Part 3 (Courtesy of YouTube)
Accompanying Abhishek Raghuram – Jalsa (Courtesy of YouTube)

Carnatic violinists
Living people
People from Dakshina Kannada district
20th-century Indian male classical singers
Musicians from Karnataka
21st-century violinists
21st-century Indian male classical singers
Year of birth missing (living people)